State secretary is the title of the senior political appointee, second in rank to the cabinet minister in charge of the ministry.  Unlike ministers, state secretaries are not members of the government.

Each cabinet minister has a state secretary, who is the closest person working with the cabinet minister. Some cabinet ministers of higher rank, like the prime minister and the minister for finance, have more than one state secretary.  If a minister dies or resigns, or if a government resigns, the state secretary also turns in their resignation.

For historical reasons, the state secretary in the Ministry for Foreign Affairs has another title (in English literally "cabinet secretary").  State secretaries tend to, more often than the ministers, hail from a fixed civil servant background or a professional background relevant to the area of responsibility of their ministry.

See also 
 Secretary of state
 Ministerial governance

Government of Sweden